Honour is a 2014 British contemporary thriller film focusing on "honour killings".

Plot 
The story depicts a young woman, Mona, living in London with her family of Pakistani origins. Mona has a boyfriend of whom her family do not approve, and believe the relationship to be a blight on the family's honour. After plans to elope fail, Mona is forced to go on the run from her family, who attempt to locate and punish her, which will likely lead to her being killed.

Cast 
 Paddy Considine as Bounty Hunter
 Aiysha Hart as Mona
 Faraz Ayub as Kasim
 Shubham Saraf as Adel
 Harvey Virdi as Mona's mother
 Nikesh Patel as Tanvir

Reception 
The critical reception was mixed, receiving a 43% rating on Rotten Tomatoes with a consensus that the positives of Khan's direction were wasted on a "formulaic, intermittently effective thriller". Rex Reed in the New York Observer saying it is "no masterpiece, but it is an accomplished debut", and Jeanette Catsoulis in The New York Times commenting "what this confident debut lacks in subtlety, it more than makes up in execution".
Mark kermode of The Observer reviewed the film giving it a rating of 2 out of 5 stars saying it "avoids worthiness but succumbs to melodrama".

References

External links
 
 
 
 

British action thriller films
2014 films
2010s English-language films
2010s British films
Films about honor killing